This is a list of albums released under Takeover Entertainment Limited.

2000s

2007

2008

2009

2010s

2010

2011

2012

Upcoming studio album(s)

TBA

Upcoming studio album single(s)

References and notes

External links
 Contact page — Takeover Entertainment Limited — Contact page

Discographies of British record labels
Hip hop discographies
Electronic music discographies
Discography